The 2012 Gainare Tottori season sees Gainare Tottori compete in J.League Division 2 for the second consecutive season. Gainare Tottori are also competing in the 2012 Emperor's Cup.

Players

Competitions

J. League

League table

Matches

Emperor's Cup

References

Gainare Tottori
Gainare Tottori seasons